This is a comprehensive list of victories of the  cycling team. The races are categorized according to the UCI Continental Circuits rules.

Sources:

2012 RusVelo

Team Pursuit World Cup Beijing
Team Pursuit World Cup Astana
Stage 2 Vuelta a Murcia, Alexander Serov
Stage 5 Grand Prix of Sochi, Leonid Krasnov
Stage 1 Grand Prix of Adygeya, Sergey Firsanov
Stage 3 Grand Prix of Adygeya, Alexander Mironov
Stage 5 Grand Prix of Adygeya, Viktor Manakov
Overall Vuelta a la Comunidad de Madrid, Sergey Firsanov
Stage 2, Sergey Firsanov
Stage 8 Tour of Qinghai Lake, Artur Ershov
Stage 3 Tour of China II, Leonid Krasnov
Stage 1 Tour of Hainan, Leonid Krasnov

2013 RusVelo

Stage 1 (ITT) Grand Prix of Adygeya, Ilnur Zakarin
Memorial Oleg Dyachenko, Alexander Rybakov
Grand Prix of Moscow, Ivan Kovalev
Stage 3 Five Rings of Moscow, Sergey Klimov
Stage 1a Tour of Estonia, Leonid Krasnov
 Time Trial Championships, Ilnur Zakarin
Stage 1 Volta a Portugal, Alexander Serov
Stage 1 Vuelta Ciclista a Costa Rica, Evgeny Kovalev
Stage 5 Vuelta Ciclista a Costa Rica, Alexander Serov

2014 RusVelo

Overall Grand Prix of Sochi, Ilnur Zakarin
Stage 1, Sergey Lagutin
Stage 2, Roman Maikin
Overall Grand Prix of Adygeya, Ilnur Zakarin
Stage 1 (ITT), Ilnur Zakarin
Stages 2 & 5, Igor Boev
Mayor Cup, Sergey Lagutin
Memorial Oleg Dyachenko, Andrey Solomennikov
Overall Five Rings of Moscow, Andrey Solomennikov
Stages 2 & 4, Igor Boev
Stage 3, Sergey Lagutin
Overall Tour d'Azerbaïdjan, Ilnur Zakarin
Overall Grand Prix Udmurtskaya Pravda, Artur Ershov
Stage 1 (ITT), Timofey Kritsky
Stage 4, Artur Ershov
Stage 7 Tour of Qinghai Lake, Timofey Kritsky
Stage 2 Baltic Chain Tour, Ivan Balykin
Overall Tour of Kavkaz, Sergey Firsanov
Stage 2, Igor Boev
Stage 4, Sergey Firsanov

2015 RusVelo

Grand Prix of Sochi Mayor, Sergey Firsanov
Overall Grand Prix of Sochi, Alexander Foliforov
Stage 4 (ITT), Alexander Foliforov
Krasnodar–Anapa, Andrey Solomennikov
Stage 3 Tour of Kuban, Roman Maikin
Maykop–Ulyap–Maykop, Ivan Balykin
Overall Grand Prix of Adygeya, Sergey Firsanov
Stage 2, Sergey Firsanov
Stage 5 Tour d'Azerbaïdjan, Sergey Firsanov
Stage 1 (ITT) Tour of Slovenia, Artem Ovechkin
 Time Trial Championships, Artem Ovechkin
 U23 Road Race Championships, Artem Nych
Stage 4 Tour of Qinghai Lake, Ivan Savitskiy

2016 Gazprom–RusVelo

 Overall Settimana Internazionale di Coppi e Bartali, Sergey Firsanov
Stage 1b (TTT) 
Stage 2, Sergey Firsanov
Giro dell'Appennino, Sergey Firsanov
Stage 15 (ITT) Giro d'Italia, Alexander Foliforov
Stage 2 Tour of Estonia, Roman Maikin
Stage 2 Tour du Limousin, Roman Maikin

2017 Gazprom–RusVelo
Stage 4 Okolo Slovenska, Ivan Savitskiy
 Road Race Championships, Alexander Porsev

2018 Gazprom–RusVelo
Stage 2 Toscana-Terra di Ciclismo, Aleksandr Vlasov
 Overall Giro Ciclistico d'Italia, Aleksandr Vlasov

2019 Gazprom–RusVelo
Stage 6 Tour of Austria, Aleksandr Vlasov
 Road Race Championships, Aleksandr Vlasov

2020 Gazprom–RusVelo
No recorded victories

2021 Gazprom–RusVelo
 Road Race Championships, Artem Nych
Stage 3 Tour de Limousin, Simone Velasco
Stage 4 Okolo Jižních Čech, Damiano Cima

2022 Gazprom–RusVelo
 Stage 1 Tour of Antalya, Matteo Malucelli
 Stage 6 UAE Tour, Mathias Vacek

Supplementary statistics

References

Rusvelo